The International Association of Aviation Personnel Schools (formerly the European Association of Aviation Pilot Schools) is a worldwide association of pilot schools. The organization was created on 25 October 1995, and was later renamed in 2009 to also include aviation schools not located in Europe.
 
The IAAPS is recognized by various national and international aviation authorities. The association is also part of the rulemaking group of the European Aviation Safety Agency (EASA). The organization currently represents 25 member schools and puts forward goals to improve the quality of pilot studies and to represent the schools in the official administrations, including the Civil Aviation Authority, and the European Aviation Safety Agency (EASA). It is also supported by European aircraft manufacturer Airbus, which organizes many of the logistical aspects the association, including Airbus headquarters.

History
The European Joint Aviation Authority (JAA) was originally formed as a direct result of the implementation of the so-called "Cyprus Agreement" in 1990. In 1995, the European Association of Airline Pilot Schools (EAAPS) was established.

The EAAPS was active in the pan-European project to define and standardize the depth and scope of flight training within the JAA. As a result, the "Joint Aviation Requirement Flight Crew Licensing Code" (JAR-FCL) was established. The name of the organization was changed to the IAAPS in 2009 after becoming a worldwide association.

Mission
As a global pilot shortage grows, members of the IIAPS work together to maintain and improve the quality standards of pilot training. Aviation training improves air safety standards.

The IAAPS is recognized by the EASA as a representative of the flight training industry. Memberships of the IAAPS include that of the EASA Advisory Board, the Safety Standards Consultative Committee, Subject Expert Team (SET), the Theoretical Knowledge Steering Group and the Human Factors Steering Group.

The IAAPS helped to develop "learning objectives" for aircraft and helicopters. These developments were published by the Joint Aviation Authorities and later by the European Aviation Safety Agency.

Members
The association includes 24 member schools in 14 countries. Each member organization is certified nationally. The international membership is currently expanding. Member flight schools include:

 Austria
 AeronautX Luftfahrtschule gmbH
 Belgium
 Ben-air Flight Academy
 Sabena Flight Academy
 Croatia
 Croatia Aviation Training Center
 Finland
 Finnish Aviation Academy
 France
 Airbus Training Division
 École de Pilotage Amaury de La Grange
 École Nationale de l'aviation Civile
 ESMA Aviation Academy
 Institut aéronautique Jean Mermoz
 Germany
 Haeusl 'air, IKON Gmbh
 Lufthansa Flight Training Academy
 Erband Deutsche Verkehrsfliegerschule
 Greece
 Egnatia Aviation
 Mesogeion Aeroclub
 Morocco
 École Nationale des Pilotes de Ligne
 Netherlands
 EPST
 KLM Flight Academy
 CAE Global Academy
 Amsterdam Nationale Luchtvaart School
 Stella Aviation Academy.
 Spain
 Asociación de Escuelas de Formación Aeronáutica
 Flight Training Europe.
 Sweden
 European Flight Training Academy
 Scandinavian Aviation Academy
 Switzerland
 Swiss Aviation Training
 Turkey
 ER-AH Aviation Commerce
 United Kingdom
 London Metropolitan University
 Oxford Aviation Academy

References

External links
 

Aviation schools
International aviation organizations
Organizations established in 1995